Campiglia may refer to:

Places in Italy
Campiglia Cervo
Campiglia dei Berici
Campiglia Marittima

People
Bob Campiglia, American football coach
Giovanni Domenico Campiglia, Italian painter

Italian-language surnames